ㅢ is one of the Korean hangul. The Unicode for ㅢ is U+3162. It makes the 'ui' sound.

References

Hangul jamo
Vowel letters